The 2014 season was the first season of the Torneo Federal A, third division professional of football in Argentina. For this season, AFA decided to change the structure in the Argentine football league system, so 21 teams were invited by the Consejo Federal and 17 accepted the invitation and exceptionally 7 teams were promoted to the next season of Primera B Nacional and there were no relegations for this season. A total of 40 teams competed.

Reestructuring

Invitations

Format

First stage
The teams were divided into five zones with eight teams (a total of 40 teams) in each zone and it was played in a round-robin tournament. The team placed first of each zone was automatically promoted to Primera B Nacional, the teams placed 2º to 4º and the best 5º team from the five zones qualified for the Second Stage.

Second stage
Consists of sixteen (16) teams that qualified from the First Stage. It was played in a double-elimination tournament. The order was:
The five teams placed 2º in their respective zones were enumerated from 1º to 5º according to the points obtained in the First Stage.
The five teams placed 3º in their respective zones were enumerated from 6º to 10º according to the points obtained in the First Stage.
The five teams placed 4º in their respective zones were enumerated from 11º to 15º according to the points obtained in the First Stage.
The best team placed 5º was enumerated 16º.
The playoffs were: 1º vs 16º; 2º vs 15º; 3º vs 14º; 4º vs 13; 5º vs 12º; 6º vs 11º; 7º vs 10º; 8º vs 9º.
The winning teams qualified for the Third Stage.

Third stage
Consists of eight teams that qualified from the Second Stage. It was played in a double-elimination tournament. The teams remain with the designated positions of the Second Stage.
The playoffs were: 1º vs 8º; 2º vs 7º; 3º vs 6º; 4º vs 5º. The winning teams qualified for the Fourth Stage.

Fourth stage
Consists of four(4) teams that qualified from the Second Stage. It was played in a double-elimination tournament. The teams remain with the designated positions of the Second Stage.
The playoffs were: 1º vs 4; 2º vs 3º. The winning teams were promoted to Primera B Nacional.

Relegations
As it is a transition tournament there will be no relegations.

Club information

Zone 1

Zone 2

Zone 3

Zone 4

1 Play their home games at Estadio Antonio Romero.

Zone 5

1 Play their home games at Estadio José María Minella.

First stage
The teams were divided into five zones and it was played in a round-robin system. The team placed first of each zone was automatically promoted to Primera B Nacional, the teams placed 2º to 4º and the best 5º team from the five zones qualified for the Second Stage.

Zone 1

Results

Zone 2

Results

Zone 3

Tiebreaker

Results

Zone 4

Results

Zone 5

Tiebreaker

Results

Second to Fourth stage

Ordering Table

Second stage

|-

|-

|-

|-

|-

|-

|-

|-

Third stage

|-

|-

|-

|-

Fourth stage
The winners were promoted.

|-

|-

Season statistics

Top scorers

See also
2013–14 in Argentine football

References

External links
 Sitio Oficial de AFA   
 Ascenso del Interior  
 Interior Futbolero  
 Mundo Ascenso  

Torneo Federal A seasons
3